870 Manto (prov. designation:  or ) is a stony background asteroid and slow rotator from the inner region of the asteroid belt. It was discovered on 12 May 1917, by astronomer Max Wolf at the Heidelberg Observatory in southwest Germany. It was named after Manto, a prophetess in Greek mythology.

Orbit and classification 

Manto is a non-family asteroid of the main belt's background population when applying the hierarchical clustering method to its proper orbital elements. It orbits the Sun in the inner asteroid belt at a distance of 1.7–2.9 AU once every 3 years and 6 months (1,293 days; semi-major axis of 2.32 AU). Its orbit has an eccentricity of 0.27 and an inclination of 6° with respect to the ecliptic. The body's observation arc begins with its official discovery observation at Heidelberg Observatory on 12 May 1917.

Naming 

This minor planet was named after Manto from Greek mythology. She was the daughter of Teresias Thebanus and a famous soothsayer, who erected of a temple of Apollo (Apollo Clarius) in Claros. The  was also mentioned in The Names of the Minor Planets by Paul Herget in 1955.

Physical characteristics 

Manto is a common stony S-type asteroid in the Bus–Binzel SMASS classification, and in both the Tholen- and SMASS-like taxonomy of the Small Solar System Objects Spectroscopic Survey (S3OS2).

Rotation period 

In September 2013, a rotational lightcurve of Manto was obtained from photometric observations by Frederick Pilcher at the Organ Mesa Observatory , New Mexico, in collaboration with Eduardo Manuel Alvarez, Andrea Ferrero, Daniel Klinglesmith and Julian Oey Lightcurve analysis gave an exceptionally long rotation period of  hours with a notably high brightness amplitude of  magnitude, indicative of an elongated shape. With a period above 100 hours, the asteroid is a slow rotator. The result supersedes observations by Alain W. Harris from July 1981, and by astronomers at the Intermediate Palomar Transient Factory in California.

In 2016, a modeled lightcurve gave a concurring sidereal period of  hours using data from a large collaboration of individual observers (such as above). The study also determined two spin axes of (96.0°, 30.0°) and (283.0°, 35.0°) in ecliptic coordinates (λ, β).

Diameter and albedo 

The Collaborative Asteroid Lightcurve Link assumes a standard albedo for a stony asteroid of 0.20 and calculates a diameter of 13.71 kilometers based on an absolute magnitude of 11.68.

References

External links 
 Lightcurve Database Query (LCDB), at www.minorplanet.info
 Dictionary of Minor Planet Names, Google books
 Discovery Circumstances: Numbered Minor Planets (1)-(5000) – Minor Planet Center
 
 

000870
Discoveries by Max Wolf
Named minor planets
000870
000870
19170512